Marathon is a city in the middle of the Florida Keys, in Monroe County, Florida, United States. As of the 2020 census, the city had a population of 9,689, up from 8,297 in 2010.

History

Though the area has been settled for some time, Marathon is a relatively new city, incorporated in 1999. 

The name Marathon dates back to the origin of the Florida East Coast Railroad. The name came from the railroad workers who were working night and day to complete the railway; due to the unrelenting pace and struggle to complete the project, workers complained that "this is getting to be a real marathon", and the word was later used to name the local railroad station.

The Keys historian Dan Gallager in his book Florida's Great Ocean Railway credits New York playwright Witter Bynner for naming Marathon. According to Gallager, J.R. Parrott, then Florida East Coast Railway's President and General Manager, invited Brynner to the Keys to "plot stations for the railroad". When asked to generate a name for the station at Key Vaca, Brynner proposed "Marathon", inspired by the following passage from Byron: "The mountains look on Marathon—and Marathon looks on the sea."

Hurricane Irma
Marathon experienced significant damage from the September 10, 2017, U.S. landfall of Hurricane Irma. One of the earliest casualties of the storm was a man who died in a school shelter. Marathon was one of the earliest spots in the Keys to receive transport of needed supplies to deal with the aftermath of Irma. The Air National Guard landed two C-130 transport planes every two hours beginning on the morning of September 11.

Geography
Marathon occupies a series of keys (islands) near the middle of the Florida Keys.

The city boundaries extend from the east end of the Seven Mile Bridge (Mile Marker 47) to the west end of Tom's Harbor Bridge (Mile Marker 61), excluding that portion of the area within the city limits of Key Colony Beach. Among the islands within the city limits are Boot Key, Knight's Key, Hog Key, Vaca Key, Stirrup Key, Crawl Key, Little Crawl Key, East and West Sister's Island, Deer Key, Fat Deer Key (excluding the portion in Key Colony Beach), Long Point Key, and Grassy Key. The Marathon Publix and the United States Post Office for Marathon (zipcode 33050) are near the stop light on the Overseas Highway (US 1) for Sombrero Beach Road at Mile Marker (MM) 50 which is the major business district for Marathon and is about halfway between Key Largo and Key West.

Its city limits extend  from land into the adjacent waters.

Boot Key Harbor is a natural body of water between Boot Key and Key Vaca, entirely within the Marathon city limits.

Climate
Marathon has a tropical savanna climate (Aw in the Köppen and Trewartha climate classifications). There is no record of snow/frost/freeze in Marathon. Like much of Florida and the Florida Keys, Marathon has two seasons; a hot and wet season from May through October, and a warm and dry season from November through April.

Demographics

2020 census

As of the 2020 United States census, there were 9,689 people, 3,797 households, and 2,151 families residing in the city.

2000 census
As of the census of 2000, there were 10,255 people, 4,597 households, and 2,735 families residing in the city. The racial makeup of the city was 91.09% White, 4.65% African American, 0.36% Native American, 0.48% Asian, 0.04% Pacific Islander, 2.00% from other races, and 1.38% from two or more races. Hispanic or Latino of any race were 20.43% of the population. As of 2010, City-Data states racial makeup of the city was White alone – 5,508 (66.4%), Hispanic – 2,224 (26.8%), Black alone – 357 (4.3%), Asian alone – 90 (1.1%), Two or more races - 89 (1.1%), American Indian alone – 25 (0.3%), Native Hawaiian and Other Pacific Islander alone – 2 (0.02%), Other race alone – 2 (0.02%).

There were 4,597 households, out of which 34.8% had children under the age of 18 living with them, 48.0% were married couples living together, 7.5% had a female householder with no husband present, and 20.5% were non-families. 29.2% of all households were made up of individuals, and 8.6% had someone living alone who was 65 years of age or older. The average household size was 2.19 and the average family size was 2.68.

In the city, the population was spread out, with 17.3% under the age of 18, 6.1% from 18 to 24, 28.6% from 25 to 44, 32.0% from 45 to 64, and 16.0% who were 65 years of age or older. The median age was 44 years. For every 100 females, there were 110.6 males. For every 100 females age 18 and over, there were 111.7 males.

The median income for a household in the city was $36,010, and the median income for a family was $46,361. Males had a median income of $27,057 versus $24,592 for females. The per capita income for the city was $22,894. About 9.4% of families and 14.2% of the population were below the poverty line, including 10.9% of those under age 18 and 13.5% of those age 65 or over.

As of 2000, English as a first language accounted for 78.10%, while Spanish as a mother tongue made up 20.95% of the population.

Churches

Calvary Baptist Church
Church of Christ
First Baptist Church
Jehovah's Witnesses Kingdom Hall
Kirk of the Keys (Covenant Order Evangelical Presbyterian-ECO) 
Marathon Baptist Church
Marathon Church of God
Marathon Community United Methodist Church
Marathon Seventh Day Adventist
Martin Luther Chapel
New Life Assembly of God
Saint Paul A.M.E Church
San Pablo Catholic Church
St Columba Episcopal Church
The Church of Jesus Christ of Latter-day Saints

Economy

Marathon is a major sport fishing destination, with several charter fishing boats departing from local marinas every morning to both the Gulf of Mexico and the Atlantic Ocean. Bountiful reefs around Marathon make it a popular diving, snorkeling, spearfishing, and lobster tickling area. One of the last untouched tropical hardwood hammocks in the Keys is found at Crane Point Museum, just a few miles west of Florida Keys Marathon Airport. The vicinity of the airport is one of the most reliable sites in the United States to see the hard-to-find Antillean nighthawk. As in the rest of the Keys in summer, gray kingbirds are often seen on telephone wires along US 1 and black-whiskered vireos incessantly sing in the hammocks. Marathon also hosts burrowing owls.

The Fisherman's Hospital is in the west end of the city. It is one of just three hospitals in the Florida Keys. Marathon is home to another "hospital", The Turtle Hospital, one of a handful of facilities in the United States that rescue, rehabilitate, and release injured sea turtles.

Marathon derives much of its livelihood from the ocean and seafood is a staple at most restaurants. There are many restaurants, including the Overseas Bar and Grill, The Island Tiki Bar and Grill, Lazy Days South, Burdines, Keys Fisheries, Castaway, The Sunset Grill, The Stuffed Pig and Marathon Bagel Shop.

It was damaged by several recent hurricanes. With the redevelopment of the Faro Blanco property with a new Hyatt Place Hotel, restaurant and marina, and the redevelopment of the former Ramada Inn hotel into a new Hampton Inn and Suites hotel, Marathon is experiencing a social and economic rebirth.

Arts and culture

Library
A branch of the Monroe County Public Library is in Marathon.

Education
Residents are zoned to schools in the Monroe County School District.

Schools
 Stanley Switlik Elementary (K–5 center)
 Marathon Middle/High School
 Martin Luther Children's Day School
 Kreative Kids Christian Academy

Transportation

Highways
Marathon is served by U.S. Highway 1, known locally as the Overseas Highway. The Overseas Highway extends westward, connecting Marathon with Key West. To the northeast, the Overseas Highway connects Marathon to Homestead and Miami.

Airport
Marathon is served by the Florida Keys Marathon Airport .

Mass transit
Metrobus Route 301 (Dade-Monroe Express) carries riders back-and-forth from Marathon with a stop near MM 50 and the Publix store to a stop near Walmart in Florida City, with additional stops at Islamorada, Tavernier, and Key Largo.

Key West Transit connects Marathon with Key West.

Greyhound Lines buses run east and west from Marathon twice a day, stopping at the Marathon Airport.

Notable people
 Tony Bryant, former NFL player
 Gary Burghoff, Radar from the TV series M*A*S*H
 Nick Carter, Backstreet Boys member
 Clarence Clemons, E Street Band saxophonist
 Kenny G, musician
 Stanley Switlik, parachuting pioneer
 Bruce Willis & Demi Moore, actors
 Max Yasgur, Woodstock's farmer legend

See also

 Florida Keys Keynoter
 George Adderley House
 Pigeon Key
 Hurricane Donna
 Marathon Shores
 Valhalla (Marathon)

References

External links

 
 Crane Point Museum & Nature Center
 A Complete Guide to the Florida Keys and Key West
 Nautical Chart of Marathon

 
Cities in Monroe County, Florida
Cities in Florida
Populated coastal places in Florida on the Atlantic Ocean
Former census-designated places in Florida
Beaches of Monroe County, Florida
Beaches of Florida
1999 establishments in Florida
Populated places established in 1999